Oh My Rosemary was one of the most popular Polish soldier songs from time of First World War and its aftermath conflicts like the Polish-Soviet War. It was found in nearly all of the contemporary song collections. There is no uniform text, as there were several variations.

The text of the song is a variation of older folksongs of unknown authorship, and there were records of the more common version being known at least in 1913. The most common version of the war time has been attributed to, or perhaps simply written down and published (in 1915), by the poet . All three of them were members of the Polish Legions in World War I.

Lyrics
 Blossom, oh my rosemary
 I'll visit the girl, I'll visit the only one
 I'll ask her.

 And if she tells me she doesn't love me
 Uhlans are recruiting, riflemen are marching
 I'll enlist.

 They'll give me a bay horse
 And a sharp sabre, and a sharp sabre
 For me to carry.

 They'll give me an overcoat
 And high boots, and high boots
 With spurs.

 They'll give me an uniform in dark grey
 So that I don't long for, so that I don't long for
 My home.

 They'll give me a canteen full of vodka
 So that I don't long for, so that I don't long for
 The girl.

 They'll give me a medallion with Holy Mary
 For her to protect me, for her to protect me
 Far away near Moscow.

 They'll lead us out of trenches, with bayonets fixed
 Bayonet will sting me, death will kiss me
 But not you.

References

1915 songs
Songs of World War I
Polish-language songs